Brad Hibbs Wyman (born May 13, 1963) is an American film producer, best known for producing Monster (2003). His first film was White of the Eye, and later worked on Freeway, Trees Lounge, The Dark Backward, The Chase, and Barb Wire. He lives in Los Angeles, California.

Filmography
He was a producer in all films unless otherwise noted.

Film

As an actor

Production manager

Miscellaneous crew

Thanks

Television

As an actor

Thanks

External links

1963 births
Living people
Businesspeople from Los Angeles
Film producers from California